Benjamin Cremaschi (born March 2, 2005) is a professional soccer player who plays as a midfielder for the American club Inter Miami. He has been called up to youth sides for both the United States and Argentina.

Club career
Cremaschi began playing soccer with Key Biscayne SC at the age of 6, and at 14 moved to the Weston Academy. He helped the Weston Academy win the 2021 U16 MLS Next Cup, where he won the Golden Boot. He moved to the youth sides of Inter Miami in 2021. In 2022, he helped the Inter Miami U17s win the Generation Adidas Cup
and earned a MLS NEXT All-Star selection. He also debuted with Inter Miami II in 2022, scoring 5 and assisting one that season in the MLS Next Pro. On November 22, 2022, he signed his first professional contract with the senior Inter Miami side on a 3-year contract. He made his professional debut with Inter Miami as a late substitute in a 2–0 Major League Soccer win over CF Montréal on February 25, 2023.

International career 
Born in the United States, Cremaschi is of Argentine descent. He was called up to the United States U19s for their winning campaign at the Slovenia Nations Cup in September 2022. He was called up to a training camp for the United States U20s in October 2022 to prepare for the 2023 FIFA U-20 World Cup. On December 7, 2022, he was called up to the Argentina U20s for a training camp in anticipation of the 2023 South American U-20 Championship.

References

External links
 
 NYFC Profile

2005 births
Living people
Soccer players from Miami
American soccer players
United States men's youth international soccer players
American people of Argentine descent
Association football midfielders
Inter Miami CF players
Inter Miami CF II players
Major League Soccer players
MLS Next Pro players
Homegrown Players (MLS)